Sinan (Arabic: سنان sinān) is a name found in Arabic and Early Arabic, meaning spearhead. The name may also be related to the Ancient Greek name Sinon. It was used as a male given name.

Etymology 
The word is possibly stems from the Arabic verb سَنَّ sanna, which means to "grind, sharpen, to make a point or dot". Another older meaning probably refer to "age", the length of time that a person has lived or a thing has existed, or the old age. Also, another meaning refers to "make a law/ legislation about something".

The general meaning is "sharpened point/ nib of the spear or lance(t)" which could possibly have a symbolic connotation representing a pointed arch, some referring to the niche of a mihrab, since the mihrab represent the "point, direction" of prayer to the Ka'abah in Islam. In a hadith narrated by Abu Juhaifa in Sahih al-Bukhari, "Once Allah's Messenger went to Al-Batha' at noon, performed the ablution and offered a two rak'at Zuhr prayer and a two-rak'at 'Asr prayer while a spearheaded stick was planted before him and the passersby were passing in front of it".

In another tradition, the battle standard of Muhammad, known in Turkish as Sancak-ı Şerif ("Holy Standard"), was believed to have served as the curtain over the entrance of his wife Aisha's tent, the standard had been part of the turban of Buraydah ibn al-Khasib, an enemy who was ordered to attack Muhammad, but instead bowed to him, unwound his turban and affixed it to his spear, dedicating it and himself to Muhammad's service.

In an Islamic interpretation of dreams, denotes the emblem of a religious man or a scholar, then it means innovation.

The name has been mostly used in Ottoman times, generally used as a common Turkish baby name.

Notable people with the name Sinan include:

Pre-20th century
 Sinon, warrior in Greek mythology who was involved in the Trojan Wars
 Sinān ibn al-Fatḥ (10th century), mathematician from Ḥarrān
 Mimar Sinan (1489–1588), chief architect and civil engineer for three Ottoman sultans
 Khaled bin Sinan, pre-Islamic prophet
 Sinan ibn Thabit, Sabian physician, father of Ibrahim ibn Sinan
 Ibrahim ibn Sinan (908–946), mathematician and astronomer in Baghdad
 Rashid ad-Din Sinan (died ca. 1193), known as "Old Man of the Mountain", one of the leaders of the Nizari Ismaili community in Syria
 Atik Sinan (fl. died 1471), "old Sinan", Ottoman architect

Ottoman officers
 Koca Sinan Pasha (1506–1596), Albanian born Grand Vizier, Ottoman military commander (pasha) and statesman
 Sinan Pasha (Ottoman admiral) (died 1553), in full Sinanüddin Yusuf Pasha, Kapudan Pasha (Grand Admiral) of the Ottoman Navy
 Hadım Sinan Pasha (died 1517), Ottoman grand vizier
 Sinan Reis (died 1546?), Sephardic Jewish Barbary corsair and lieutenant to Hayreddin Barbarossa
 Cığalazade Yusuf Sinan Pasha (c. 1545–1605), Ottoman statesman of Italian background
 Sinan-paša Sijerčić (died 1806), Bosniak Commander of the Ottoman Army

Post-19th century
 Hakan Karahan (born 1960), Turkish writer who uses pseudonym Sinan

Given name
 Sinan Akçıl (born 1981), Turkish pop composer and songwriter
 Sinan Akdag (born 1989), German ice hockey defenceman
 Sinan Akkuş (born 1971), Turkish-German actor, director, film producer and writer
 Sinan Al Shabibi (born 1941), governor of the Central Bank of Iraq
 Sinan Alaağaç (1960–1985), Turkish footballer
 Sinan Albayrak (born 1973), Turkish TV and film actor
 Sinan Alimanović (born 1954), Bosnian musician
 Sinan Antoon (born 1967), Iraqi poet and novelist
 Sinan Ayrancı (born 1990), Turkish-Swedish footballer
 Sinan Bakış (born 1994), Turkish footballer
 Sinan Bolat (born 1988), Turkish-Belgian footballer
 Sinan Bytyqi (born 1995), Albanian-Austrian footballer
 Sinan Çalışkanoğlu (born 1978), Turkish actor
 Sinan Can (born 1977), Dutch-Turkish journalist
 Sinan Cem Tanık (born 1980), Turkish volleyball player
 Sinan Çetin (born 1953), Turkish actor, film director, and producer
 Sinan Demircioğlu (born 1975), Turkish footballer
 Sinan Erbil (born 1965), Turkmen singer
 Sinan Erdem (1927–2003), Turkish volleyball player and head of the Turkish National Olympic Committee
 Sinan Güler (born 1983), Turkish basketball player
 Sinan Gümüş (born 1994), Turkish-German footballer
 Sinan Hasani (1922–2010), Yugoslav politician
 Sinan Kaloğlu (born 1981), Turkish footballer
 Sinan Keskin (born 1994), Dutch-Turkish footballer
 Sinan Kurt (born 1996), German footballer
 Sinan Kurumuş (born 1994), Turkish footballer
 Sinan Oğan (born 1967), Turkish politician
 Sinan Ören (born 1987), Turkish footballer
 Sinan Ozen (born 1964), popular Turkish musician and actor
 Sinan Özkan (born 1986), Turkish footballer
 Sinan Sakić (1956–2018), Serbian folk singer
 Sinan Şamil Sam (1974–2015), Turkish-German boxer
 Sinan Savaskan (born 1954), Turkish-British classical music composer
 Sinan Sofuoğlu (1983–2008), Turkish motorcycle racer
 Sun Sinan (born 1988), Chinese field hockey player
 Sinan Tekerci (born 1993), Turkish footballer
 Sinan Tuzcu (born 1977), Turkish actor
 Sinan Uzun (born 1990), Turkish footballer

Surname
 Asif Sinan, Pakistani Indian classical and jazz musician

See also
 Sinan (disambiguation)
 Synan